Lebonya is a proposed intermediate group of Bantu languages coded Zone D in Guthrie's classification. There are three branches:
Lengola
Bodo
the Nyali languages

Glottolog 2.3 classifies Bodo instead as one of the Ngendan languages.

References